The Canton River passes through downtown Canton, Massachusetts, tracing down Washington and Neponset Streets (flowing under the Canton Viaduct), and continues down Walpole Street. It is a tributary of the Neponset River, with a few tributaries on the side.  It is also called the East Branch [of the] Neponset River.

Rivers of Norfolk County, Massachusetts
Rivers of Massachusetts